Jean-Marc Jancovici (born 1962) is a French engineering consultant, energy and climate expert, professor, conference speaker, writer, and independent columnist. He is co-founder and associate at the Carbone 4 consultancy firm, and the founding president of the think-tank The Shift Project.

Biography 
He graduated from the École polytechnique in 1984 and from the Ecole nationale supérieure des télécommunications de Paris in 1986.

He is the author and the main developer of the main French carbon accounting method, the Bilan Carbone assessment tool for the French Inter-ministerial Greenhouse Gas Mission.

He collaborated with Nicolas Hulot for 11 years, and co-authored the Pacte écologique, a book that directly led to the Grenelle Environnement during the first years of Nicolas Sarkozy's presidency. He is a member of the SOeS Scientific Committee (MEEDDEM observation and statistics department) and a member of the Fondation Nicolas-Hulot Strategic Committee.

He is the founding president of The Shift Project, a corporate sponsored think tank established in 2010, which advocates a progressive phase out of fossil fuels from our economy.

In 2007 he founded the Carbone 4 consultancy with the economist Alain Grandjean. Carbone 4 is a Paris-based consultancy employing around 30 people, which has specialized in adapting human activities (especially economic activities) to any kind of energy constraint (lack of oil, lack of gas, lack of electricity, rising prices, rising constraints on greenhouse gas emissions, new norms or regulations, etc.)

He founded two other organisations focused on spreading scientific knowledge about energy and climate change (still active), and is currently chairing the environment section of his alumni, X Environnement. He teaches at Mines ParisTech to first year students on energy and climate change basics.

He is a member of the association ASPO France, which studies the oil peak and its consequences.

Personal life
He is married and has two daughters.

He eats little meat, uses public transport, has no cellphone and avoids air travel whenever possible.

Media, lectures, internet, website
He is the author of eight books and has written for a number of French media (France Info, TF1, Les Echos). His book "Le monde sans fin" is translated into multiple languages.

Positions

Jancovici is a vocal proponent of nuclear energy, and advocates for nuclear power to become a dominant energy source. He believes the climate urgency requires closing all coal power plants worldwide within 30 years. He argues that non-nuclear renewable energies will never be sufficient to transition to a carbon-neutral economy.

Publications
    "Le monde sans fin" with Christophe Blain (Dargaud, 2021), English translation: "World without end" (Europe Comics, 2022)
    "Dormez tranquilles jusqu'en 2100, et autres malentendus sur le climat et l'énergie" (Odile Jacob, 2015)
    "Transition énergétique pour tous" (2011, Odile Jacob)
    "C’est maintenant ! 3 ans pour sauver le monde" with Alain Grandjean (Janvier 2009, Le Seuil)
    "Le changement climatique expliqué à ma fille" (Janvier 2009, Le Seuil)
    "Le Plein s’il vous plaît" with Alain Grandjean (Le Seuil, Février 2006)
    "L'effet de serre, allons-nous changer le climat ?" with Hervé Le Treut (Flammarion, 2004)
    "L'avenir climatique, quel temps ferons-nous ?" (Le Seuil, 2002)

References

External links

 
 

1962 births
Living people
École Polytechnique alumni
French engineers
Academic staff of Mines Paris - PSL